The Santa Rosa Wilderness is a   wilderness area in Southern California, in the Santa Rosa Mountains of Riverside and San Diego counties, California. It is in the Colorado Desert section of the Sonoran Desert, above the Coachella Valley and Lower Colorado River Valley regions in a Peninsular Range, between La Quinta to the north and Anza Borrego Desert State Park to the south. The United States Congress established the wilderness in 1984 with the passage of the California Wilderness Act (Public Law 98-425), managed by both the US Forest Service (San Bernardino National Forest, 13,801 acres) and the Bureau of Land Management (58,458 acres ). Most of the Santa Rosa Wilderness is within the Santa Rosa and San Jacinto Mountains National Monument.

The Santa Rosa Mountains have areas of cultural significance containing primitive trails, roasting pits, milling stations, rock shelters and examples of rock art. Native Americans have identified areas that are currently used for temporary habitation, resource collection and ritual hunting. Remains of historical early settlement and mining include quarry sites, mining prospects and water improvements associated with natural springs.

Wildlife, vegetation and topography
The wilderness protects habitat that supports the largest herd of Peninsular bighorn sheep (Ovis canadensis) in the country. The Bighorn Institute, a non-profit research group established in 1982 by several biologists and veterinarians, estimates approximately 60 adult sheep live in the Santa Rosa Mountains, and a total population of 800 sheep in the Peninsular Ranges north of Mexico.

The Peninsular Range bighorn sheep (United States population) is a subspecies that has been protected since 1971 under the California Endangered Species Protection Act and federally protected since 1998 under the Endangered Species Act (ESA). The Peninsular Range bighorn sheep herd utilize the entire range between 1,000  to  elevation. Bear Creek, Deep Canyon and Martinez Canyon are  important as summer concentration areas and  provide the rugged escape terrain necessary for lambing.
Besides bighorn sheep, there are also mule deer, bobcat and coyote.

Native rare plants in the Santa Rosa Wilderness include shrubs such as Santa Rosa sage (Salvia eremostachya), and Nuttall's scrub oak (Quercus dumosa). Perennial herbs include  Santa Rosa Mountains leptosiphon ( Linanthus floribundus ssp. hallii), and triple ribbed milkvetch (Astragalus tricarinatus).

The rugged terrain is formed by uplifted blocks of igneous and metamorphic rocks situated between two major tectonic fault zones, the San Andreas and the San Jacinto.  Perennial streams erode the steep-walled canyons and support large fan palm oases. The Santa Rosa Mountain range and the two faults all trend northwest–southeast and are part of the Peninsular Ranges that extend from Southern California to Baja, Mexico.

Recreation
The Santa Rosa Wilderness joins wilderness areas in the San Bernardino National Forest along its western border and the designated California State Wilderness in Anza Borrego Desert State Park to the south.
 
Recreational activities in the Santa Rosa Wilderness include backpacking, horseback riding, day hiking, and nature study/photography. 
The Boo Hoff equestrian trail is one of the few trails in the wilderness that is constructed and maintained by a local equestrian club.
The Cactus Spring Trail which is an ancient aboriginal pathway, links the Santa Rosa plateau with the desert floor in the Coachella Valley. To the west, this trail connects with designated wilderness areas in the San Bernardino National Forest.
Oases trails
Bear Creek Oasis
Lost Canyon Oasis
Guadelupe Canyon and Devil Canyon
Rockhouse Canyon and valley, in the southern wilderness area, has remnants of early Native American and European settlers.
Rabbit Peak, located near the southeastern boundary,  is a notable desert peak for its challenging climb to the  summit. Local Sierra Club chapters lead organized day and overnight trips to the peak. Universities and local colleges utilize the Santa Rosa Mountains frequently as a living laboratory for scientific and informal studies and outings.

Hunting is restricted to the southern half of the wilderness since the northern portion is located within a State Wildlife Refuge. Deer, quail and dove are hunted in season.

See also
 :Category:Fauna of the Colorado Desert
 List of Sonoran Desert wildflowers
 :Category:Geography of the Colorado Desert

Notes

References

External links

Summitpost's webpage on Rabbit Peak.

Wilderness areas of California
Protected areas of the Colorado Desert
Protected areas of Riverside County, California
Coachella Valley
Oases of California
Santa Rosa Mountains (California)
Bureau of Land Management areas in California
IUCN Category Ib
Protected areas established in 1984
1984 establishments in California